Cherry Island is an island in the Detroit River, in southeast Michigan. It is in Wayne County. In 1876, it sold for $500 ($ in  dollars).

References

Islands of Wayne County, Michigan
Islands of the Detroit River
River islands of Michigan